Muellerianella is a genus of delphacid planthoppers in the family Delphacidae. There are about seven described species in Muellerianella.

Species
These seven species belong to the genus Muellerianella:
 Muellerianella brevipennis (Boheman, 1847)
 Muellerianella extrusa (Scott, 1871)
 Muellerianella fairmairei (Perris, 1857)
 Muellerianella guaduae (Muir, 1926)
 Muellerianella laminalis (Van Duzee, 1897)
 Muellerianella meadi Kennedy, Bartlett & Wilson, 2012
 Muellerianella relicta Logvinenko, 1976

References

Further reading

External links

 

Articles created by Qbugbot
Auchenorrhyncha genera
Delphacinae